{{DISPLAYTITLE:C15H13FO2}}
The molecular formula C15H13FO2 (molar mass: 244.261 g/mol, exact mass: 244.089958 u) may refer to:

 Flurbiprofen
 Tarenflurbil (also called Flurizan)

Molecular formulas